Ankit is a male given name of Indian origin that may refer to:

Ankit Bathla, Indian model and actor
Ankit Bhardwaj, Indian film and television actor
Ankit Dabas, Indian cricketer
Ankit Dane, Indian cricketer
Ankit Fadia (born 1985), Indian author and television host
Ankit Garg, Indian police official
Ankit Gera, Indian actor
Ankit Gupta, Indian actor
Ankit Kalsi, Indian cricketer
Ankit Kushwah, Indian cricketer
Ankit Lamba, Indian cricketer
Ankit Mohan, Indian actor
Ankit Narang, Indian actor
Ankit Raaj, Indian television actor and model
Ankit Rajpara, Indian chess grandmaster
Ankit Rajpoot, Indian cricketer
Ankit Tiwari, Indian singer
Ankit Trivedi, Gujarati poet

See also
Ankit Sharma (disambiguation), multiple people
Ankita, female form of this name

Indian masculine given names